Peter or Pete Hill may refer to:

Arts and entertainment
 Peter Murray-Hill (1908–1957), British actor
 Peter Buckley Hill (born 1948), British musical comedian
 Peter Hill (pianist) (born 1948), British pianist and musicologist

Sports
 Pete Hill (John Preston Hill, 1882–1951), American baseball player
 Peter Hill (cricketer) (1923–2002), Australian cricketer
 Peter Hill (footballer) (1931–2015), English footballer
 Peter Hill (cyclist) (born 1945), British cyclist
 Peter Hill (Paralympian) (born 1957), Australian Paralympic swimmer and athlete
 Peter Hill (entrepreneur) (born 1964), Australian skateboarder, entrepreneur and media producer

Others
 Peter Hill (clockmaker) (1767–1820), American clockmaker
 Ployer Peter Hill (1894–1935), known as Peter, American test pilot
 Peter Clegg-Hill, 9th Viscount Hill (born 1945), British peer
 Peter Hill (journalist) (born 1945), British former editor of the UK newspaper Daily Express
 Peter Hill (bishop) (born 1950), British bishop of Barking
 Peter Hill (writer) (active 2003), British author of Stargazing: Memoirs of a Young Lighthouse Keeper
 Peter Hill (civil servant), British civil servant

See also 
 Peter Hill-Wood (1936–2018), British businessman and football club chairman
 Peters Hill, South Australia, a peak in the Belvidere Range of hills
 Peter Youngblood Hills (born 1978), Anglo-American actor
 
 
 Hill (surname)